Yatra is an Indian religious travel guide television program that was broadcast on STAR Plus. Produced and hosted by Deepti Bhatnagar and sometimes by Nilanjana Sharma, Kavita Paudwal, Keerti Gaekwad Kelkar & Tia Bajpai, the program focuses on a spiritual journey around the Indian temples. The series premiered on 7 July 2002, and aired Sunday mornings. The word Yatra in Hindi language, and almost all other Indian languages, means "travel", more usually "travel to spiritual places".

References

External links
Yatra Official Site on STAR Plus

2002 Indian television series debuts
Indian television series
Indian travel television series
StarPlus original programming